The Hasbro Comic Book Universe (HCBU) is an American comic book franchise and shared universe created and published by IDW Publishing, based on various properties of the toy company Hasbro.

Publication history 
Following the bankruptcy of Dreamwave Productions in 2005, IDW picked up the Transformers comic book license and hired veteran writer Simon Furman to craft a rebooted continuity based on the Generation 1 toy line, similar to what Marvel Comics did through Ultimate Marvel.

In May 2008, IDW obtained the G.I. Joe comic book license from Devil's Due Publishing.

Over the years, both comics participated in several crossover events, like Infestation and Infestation 2.

In 2016, IDW gained the rights of Rom, Micronauts, Action Man and M.A.S.K. from other publishers. That same year, IDW announced the Hasbro Reconstruction campaign, in order to converge those brands in the same continuity, starting with the crossover event Revolution.

In 2017, IDW gained the rights of Visionaries, with most of its characters debuting after the crossover event First Strike.

In April 2018, IDW announced the HCBU would conclude with the limited series Transformers: Unicron in November 2018.

In-continuity canon 
IDW has never established a shared continuity between its own Transformers and G.I. Joe comics, even during the crossover event Infestation, when they both exist in separate universes, with other licensed franchises. While The Transformers has only participated in Infestation, the miniseries The Transformers: Hearts of Steel, also set in its own alternate timeline, has participated in Infestation 2. On the other side, G.I. Joe participated in both events.

While other brands exist within the HCBU (e.g. Jem, Clue and Army Ants), they did not appear in Revolution, First Strike or Transformers: Unicron for tonal  reasons. IDW's versions of My Little Pony, Dungeons & Dragons, Magic: The Gathering, Stretch Armstrong and Go-Bots exist "outside" of this universe entirely.

List of works

2005

2006

2007

2008

2009

2010

2011

2012

2013

2014

2015

2016

2017

2018

Tie-in books 

 The Transformers: Continuum (November 11, 2009) — First guidebook of the HCBU-related Transformers comics.
 G.I. Joe: Tales from the Cobra Wars (April 19, 2011) — Anthology of prose stories based on several HCBU-related G.I. Joe comics.
 Transformers: Historia (January 9, 2019) — Second guidebook of the HCBU-related Transformers comics.

Unproduced works 

 Transformers: Legacy of Rust
 Transformers: Spy Games
 Transformers: Collision Course

See also 

 List of comics based on Hasbro properties
 Hasbro Universe

References 

2005 comics debuts
2018 comics endings
Comics based on Hasbro toys
Continuity (fiction)
G.I. Joe comics
Hasbro
Hasbro franchises
IDW Publishing
Military comics
Rom the Space Knight
Science fiction comics
Superhero comics
Transformers comics